Edge rusher (alternately edge defender or simply edge) is a term designating a position in gridiron football. Some consider edge rusher to be its own position entirely.

Discussion
Players considered to be edge rushers are usually 4–3 defensive ends or 3–4 outside linebackers. Note that 3–4 outside linebackers often act as an extension of the defensive line, in that they will attack the offensive tackles or blocking tight ends on the majority of their snaps under a majority of 3–4 schemes, though it is not uncommon to see them drop back and play a more traditional 4–3 linebacker role as well.

One reason the word "edge" is used in the term "edge rusher" is that edge often refers to the area outside of offensive tackles, but within a couple of yards of the line of scrimmage. While other positions will rarely be referred to as edge rushers, other than 4–3 defensive ends and 3–4 outside linebackers, it is common for defensive backs, traditional linebackers, and even defensive tackles to occasionally play the position on a play-to-play basis.

References

American football positions